Rinat Shayna Brodach (born 1984) is an Israeli American fashion designer based in New York. She was a competitor on the first season of Making the Cut.

Early life and education 
Brodach was born in Beer Sheva, Israel. She attended the Academy of Art University in San Francisco and earned a BFA in Fashion Design. Her final thesis work earned her a scholarship to The Chambre Syndicale de la Couture Parisienne in Paris in 2010. She served in the Israeli Air Force.

Career 
Brodach moved to New York in 2012 and launched her own fashion line in 2014. As of 2018, her design focus is gender-free.

She dressed Billy Porter for the 24th Critics’ Choice Awards.

Brodach is a regular volunteer with Custom Collaborative, where she teaches women to sew.

Making the Cut 
Brodach was a contestant on Amazon’s Making the Cut. She won the fifth episode on streetwear which garnered a partnership with Puma and her clothing sold on Amazon. She was eliminated during the sixth episode.

Awards 
2020: Fashion Group International, All Gender Category finalist.

References 

Living people
Israeli fashion designers
1984 births
Israeli women fashion designers
Participants in American reality television series